Murdered Innocence is a 1995 drama film directed and co-written by Frank Coraci.

Plot

Cast

References

External links

1995 films
American thriller films
Films directed by Frank Coraci
1990s thriller films
1995 directorial debut films
1990s English-language films
1990s American films